Heaven: To the Land of Happiness is a 2021 South Korean drama film directed by Im Sang-soo, starring Choi Min-sik and Park Hae-il. It was selected to be shown at the 2020 Cannes Film Festival. The project was initially intended to be a remake of the 1997 German film Knockin' on Heaven's Door, but director Im changed many things and wrote his own script, leaving Knockin' on Heaven's Door to be considered inspiration rather than a remake.

Cast
 Choi Min-sik as 203
 Park Hae-il as Nam-sik
 Jo Han-chul
 Im Sung-jae
 Youn Yuh-jung
 Lee El
 Kim Yeo-jin
 Yoon Je-moon
 Jung Min-sung
 Noh Susanna
 Lee Jae-in

Production
Filming was completed on 19 October 2019.

Release
This film was invited for 'The Faithful' section at the 73rd Cannes Film Festival held from 12 to 23 May 2020. It was also screened as opening film of 26th Busan International Film Festival on 6 October 2021. It will be screened as closing film of the 16th London Korean Film Festival to be held from 4 to 19 November. It has also been invited to the 18th Hong Kong-Asia Film Festival to be held from 27 October to 14 November.

References

External links
 
 
 
 
 

2021 films
2021 drama films
South Korean drama films
2020s Korean-language films
Films directed by Im Sang-soo